Alison Brito Agues (born 27 October 1984) is a Cape Verdean footballer who plays as a forward.

He first appeared in the Macanese club CD Monte Carlo and was one of the first Cape Verdeans to play soccer with a Macanese club.  A year later, he played with Casa do FC Porto for the next three years and in 2013 with Windsor Arch Ka I as of 2014.

Honors

Individual records

References

External links 
Profile of Alison Brito at the Final Ball

1984 births
Living people
Association football goalkeepers
Cape Verdean footballers
Sportspeople from Praia
Footballers from Santiago, Cape Verde
Expatriate footballers in Macau
Cape Verdean expatriate footballers
Liga de Elite players